Ties is a Bulgarian comedy series emanating for bTV, produced by Emo Vision. It starred Mihail Bilalov, Lilia Maravilya, Lyuben Chatalov, Aneta Sotirova, Valeri Yordanov, Yana Marinova, Nikolai Ishkov, Angela Nedyalkova, Lori Kamburova, and Alex Alexiev. In January, 2016 FOX Networks Group acquired the rights to broadcast the first season of "Ties" for 8 territories in which it operates. Fox Life broadcasting episodes of the second season of the series. The premiere was on April 4, 2016 at 19:30 pm. The show broadcasting simultaneously in Bulgaria, Serbia, Croatia, Slovenia, Macedonia, Bosnia and Herzegovina, Montenegro, Kosovo and Albania.

Series overview

Characters 
 Mihail Bilalov – Tony, marriage counselor, husband of Mika
 Lilia Maravilya – Mika, architect, wife of Tony
 Aneta Sotirova – Felina, a former actress, mother of Tony
 Valeri Yordanov – Alexander Panov, underground boss, lover Mika and ex-boyfriend of Yasmina
 Yana Marinova – Yasmina, sexologist, mistress of Tony
 Nikolai Ishkov – No. 1, former husband of Mika, father of Leah and Bogdan
 Angela Nedyalkova – Dara, daughter of Tony and Mika
 Lorina Kamburova – Leah, lingerie model, daughter of Mika and No. 1
 Alex Alexiev – Bogdan, journalist, son of Mika, the twin brother of Leah
 Irini Zhambonas – Irina, girlfriend Number 1, Mika's friend
 Ilyana Lazarova – Mika's assistant

References

External links 
 

2010s Bulgarian television series
2015 Bulgarian television series debuts
2016 Bulgarian television series endings
Bulgarian television series
BTV (Bulgaria) original programming